Baseball at the 2000 Summer Olympics was the third time an Olympic baseball tournament had been held as a full medal sport, and the ninth time it had been part of the Summer Olympic Games in any capacity. It was held in Sydney, Australia from 17 September through to the bronze and gold medal games on 27 September. Two venues were used for the Games: the Sydney Baseball Stadium and Blacktown Olympic Park. For the first time in Olympic competition, professional baseball players were eligible to participate, though no active players from Major League Baseball were available.

The United States won the gold medal by defeating Cuba 4–0. Since becoming a medal sport, it was the first time Cuba had not won the gold medal. The gold medal game was also only the second game Cuba had lost in Olympic baseball, having lost to the Netherlands earlier in the tournament. South Korea won their first Olympic baseball medal, beating Japan in the bronze medal match 3–1.

Format 
The main tournament featured eight teams. These teams were selected from a series of continental qualifying tournaments, with the exception of Australia who qualified automatically as hosts. As had been the case at the 1996 Games in Atlanta, two teams each qualified from the Americas via the 1999 Pan American Games, Asia via the 1999 Asian Baseball Championship, and Europe via the 1999 European Baseball Championship. The final spot went to the winner of a deciding series between the African and Oceania champions, as determined by the 1999 All-Africa Games and the 1999 Oceania Baseball Championship respectively. This playoff was won by South Africa, who swept Guam in a best-of-five series in Johannesburg in December 1999.

The eight teams met in a round-robin series, facing each other once. The top four teams from this then met in the finals, with the first and fourth placed teams playing against each other in one semi final, and the second and third placed teams in the other. The losers of these semi finals competed in the bronze medal game, while the winners met in the gold medal game.

Teams

Results

Preliminary round

Final round

Semi-finals

Bronze medal game

Gold medal game

Final standings

References 

2000 Summer Olympics events
 
2000
Summer Olympics
2000 Summer Olympics
Summer Olympics
Men's events at the 2000 Summer Olympics